Moonlight Lady may refer to:

Moonlight Lady (anime), the American release title for No Surface Moon The Animation; a 2001 Japanese OVA anime series
"Moonlight Lady" (song), Julio Iglesias song written by Albert Hammond and appearing in Iglesias' 1984 album 1100 Bel Air Place
Moonlight Lady (video game), an action role-playing video game; released for PC Engine CD on 1993.